Anthony David Chisholm (born 24 February 1978) is an Australian politician. He is a member of the Australian Labor Party (ALP) and has been a Senator for Queensland since 2016. He was appointed an assistant minister in the Albanese government following the party's victory at the 2022 federal election. He previously served as the party's state secretary from 2008 to 2014.

Early life
Chisholm was born in Brisbane. He is the youngest of five children born to Marion and Neville Chisholm, who moved from Tasmania to Queensland shortly before he was born. He grew up in the city's northern suburbs and attended Wavell State High School. He later graduated from Griffith University with a Bachelor of Arts majoring in politics and international relations.

Politics
Chisholm joined the ALP in 1995. He was the party's candidate in Warrego at the 2001 Queensland state election, aged 22. He worked as an organiser from 2004 to 2007, initially with the national secretariat and then with the state branch. He then joined the staff of opposition leader Kevin Rudd as an advisor.

Chisholm served as state secretary of the ALP in Queensland from 2008 to 2014. He directed the party's successful campaign at the 2015 state election. Immediately prior to his election to parliament he work for Santos Limited, "providing advice on maintaining mainstream political support amid an ongoing campaign against the coal seam gas (CSG) industry by environmental and landholder groups".

Parliament
Following the retirement of Senator Joe Ludwig, Chisholm won ALP preselection for the 2016 federal election and was elected to the Senate.

He has served on a number of committees, and in February 2020 was made chair of the Select Committee on Administration of Sports Grants. He was Deputy Chair on the "Inquiry into the destruction of 46,000 year old caves at the Juukan Gorge in the Pilbara region of Western Australia", which delivered its interim report in December 2020.

Chisholm is a member of the right faction of the Labor Party.

In June 2022, Chisholm was appointed Assistant Minister for Education and Assistant Minister for Regional Development in the Albanese government.

References

1978 births
Living people
Griffith University alumni
Australian Labor Party members of the Parliament of Australia
Labor Right politicians
Members of the Australian Senate for Queensland
Members of the Australian Senate
21st-century Australian politicians
20th-century Australian people